"That's All She Wrote" is a 2011 song by rapper T.I.

That's All She Wrote may also refer to:

Music

 Ernest Tubb recorded a song titled “That's All She Wrote” (sheet music published in 1942)
 "That's All She Wrote" (Jerry Fuller song), 1964; recorded by:
 Johnny Cash, on the album Thanks a Lot, 1964
 Johnny Mathis, on the album Feelings, 1975
 Ray Price, see Ray Price discography, 1976
 A song on the B-side of "Boogie Grass Band" by Conway Twitty, 1974
 A song on the B-side of "Tie Your Dream to Mine" by Marty Robbins, 1982
 A song by Reba McEntire from the album Rumor Has It, 1990
 A song by Ricky Nelson, 1963
 A song by German jazz saxophonist Ingrid Laubrock on the album Roulette of the Cradle

Other uses
 "That's All She Wrote", a 2001 exhibition by Colette Justine

See also
 All She Wrote (disambiguation)